Commander Ken Dadzie was a Ghanaian soldier and a member of the Ghana Navy. He served as Chief of Naval Staff of the Ghana Navy from 6 June 1979 until July 1979 when he was replaced by Commodore Stephen Obimpeh.

See also
 Ghana Navy
 Chief of Naval Staff (Ghana)

References

Ghanaian military personnel
Chiefs of Naval Staff (Ghana)
Ghana Navy personnel